Internacional de Toronto C.F. was a short-lived Canadian soccer club founded and dissolved in 2014 and based in Toronto, Ontario. The club played in League1 Ontario, part of the third division of the Canadian soccer league system. The club played its home games out of Lamport Stadium and was coached by former Peru national team player, Nolberto Solano. The club's colours were orange and blue.

History

Internacional de Toronto was announced as one of the founding members of the newly formed League1 Ontario on April 8, 2014. Former Peru national team player Nolberto Solano was named as the team's head coach on May 1, 2014.

Internacional played its first match against Windsor Stars during the league's opening weekend on May 31, 2014, at The Soccer Centre in Vaughan, Ontario, a 2–2 draw. The club would follow its inaugural match with a 2–0 loss to Durham United FC on June 8, 2014.

On July 22, 2014, the club had its licensing agreement terminated due to issues regarding the payment of player salaries. The team had over three months of debt at the time of their termination. The club had played seven league matches at the time of their termination, earning one draw to go with six losses.

Season

Notable former players
The following players have either played at the professional or international level, either before or after playing for the League1 Ontario team:

 Raheem Edwards
 Victor Gallo

References

External links
 

Sport in Toronto
Soccer clubs in Toronto
2014 establishments in Ontario
Association football clubs established in 2014
Association football clubs disestablished in 2014
League1 Ontario teams
Defunct soccer clubs in Canada